Lamine Kebir (born 1 August 1968) is an Algerian football manager.

References

1968 births
Living people
Algerian football managers
ASO Chlef managers
JS Kabylie managers
JSM Béjaïa managers
CS Constantine managers
USM Alger managers
Algerian Ligue Professionnelle 1 managers
21st-century Algerian people